David Campbell Gowdey (August 3, 1841 – December 27, 1908) was a member of the Wisconsin State Assembly.

Biography
Gowdey was born on August 3, 1841 in New York City. He later moved to Beaver Dam, Wisconsin, and in 1885 he moved to Hurley, Wisconsin, where he established the newspaper the Montreal River Miner. He moved to Mineral Wells, Texas in 1893. He died in San Antonio in 1908 and was  buried at Odd Fellows Cemetery in the city.

Career
Gowdey was a member of the Assembly during the 1874 Session. Previously, he was City Clerk of Beaver Dam in 1866, 1867, 1869, 1871 and 1872.  He was a Democrat.

References

Politicians from New York City
Politicians from Beaver Dam, Wisconsin
Democratic Party members of the Wisconsin State Assembly
City and town clerks
1841 births
1908 deaths